Joseph Franz Maximilian, 7th Prince of Lobkowitz (also spelled Lobkowicz) (8 December 1772 – 16 December 1816) was an aristocrat of Bohemia, from the House of Lobkowicz. He is known particularly for his interest in music and as a patron of Ludwig van Beethoven.

Family
He was born in Vienna, son of Ferdinand Philipp Joseph, 6th Prince Lobkowicz (1724–1784) and Maria Gabriella di Savoia-Carignano (1748–1828). In 1786 Emperor Joseph II made him Duke of Roudnice (Herzog von Raudnitz in German, vévoda roudnický in Czech).

They had twelve children.

Patron of music

The prince was an amateur musician, playing violin and cello, and sang with a bass voice. Countess Lulu Thürheim, sister-in-law of Prince Razumowsky, said of him: "This Prince was as kindhearted as a child and the most foolish music enthusiast. He played music from dusk to dawn and spent a fortune on musicians. Innumerable musicians gathered in his house, whom he treated regally."

He was a member of the Gesellschaft der Associierten, an important concert-sponsoring organization of his time which sponsored, among other events, the 1798 premiere of Joseph Haydn's The Creation. 

In 1799, Lobkowitz commissioned a set of six string quartets from Haydn. The composer was both busy and in ill health, and he managed to complete only two of them; these were published as the composer's Opus 77 and were the last quartets he was to complete.

Lobkowitz had a private orchestra at his palace in Vienna, the Palais Lobkowitz; in the hall of the palace, this orchestra performed in 1804 Beethoven's Symphony No. 3 (which was dedicated to the Prince) before the first public performance.

In 1808 Beethoven was offered the post of Kapellmeister at Cassel, where Jérôme Bonaparte, King of Westphalia, had his court. Prince Lobkowitz, together with Archduke Rudolph and Prince Kinsky, successfully persuaded Beethoven to stay in Vienna by offering a yearly pension of 4,000 florins. In 1811 Prince Lobkowitz, in financial difficulty, discontinued paying his share. However, he eventually resumed payment, which continued past his death in 1816 until Beethoven's own death in 1827.

Beethoven dedicated several works to the Prince: his third, fifth and sixth symphonies; his String Quartets Op. 18 and String Quartet Op. 74; the Triple Concerto and the song cycle An die ferne Geliebte.

Beethoven composed a Birthday Cantata for Prince Lobkowitz (WoO 106); it was written for the composer's friend Karl Peters, tutor for the Lobkowitz family. It was intended to be sung by the young Princes on their father's birthday in 1816. However, the prince was seriously ill at that time, and died a few days later.

He died 1816 in Třeboň in South Bohemia, and was buried in Roudnice nad Labem.

Ancestors

References

External links

1772 births
1816 deaths
Joseph Franz
Czech patrons of music
Haydn's patrons
19th-century Czech people
Nobility from Vienna